Luis Enrique Iberico Robalino (born 6 February 1998) is a Peruvian professional footballer who plays for FBC Melgar as a forward.

International career
He made his debut for Peru national football team on 8 June 2021 in a World Cup qualifier against Ecuador. He substituted Christian Cueva in the 79th minute.

International goals

References

1998 births
Living people
Peruvian footballers
Peru youth international footballers
Peru under-20 international footballers
Peru international footballers
2021 Copa América players
Association football forwards
Footballers from Lima
Club Deportivo Universidad de San Martín de Porres players
FBC Melgar footballers
Universidad Técnica de Cajamarca footballers
Peruvian Primera División players